The Jackson Morrison House, at 439 Rome St. in Hartwell, Georgia, was built around 1902.  It was listed on the National Register of Historic Places in 1986.  It has also been known as the Turner Property.

It is a one-story, frame, Plain-style house with a main gable roof and a rear ell.

It was built by Jackson Morrison, a black carpenter and farmer.

References

National Register of Historic Places in Hart County, Georgia
Houses completed in 1902
1902 establishments in Georgia (U.S. state)
Hartwell, Georgia
Houses in Hart County, Georgia